John Frazer is a former Australian rules footballer who played with North Melbourne and Fitzroy in the Victorian Football League (VFL).

Frazer played 14 games with VFA club, Camberwell Football Club in 1987, kicking 91 goals!

References

External links 		
		
		
		
		
		
1956 births		
North Melbourne Football Club players		
Fitzroy Football Club players
Camberwell Football Club players
Australian rules footballers from Victoria (Australia)
Living people